Brachysomophis is a genus of eels in the snake eel family Ophichthidae.

Species
There are currently 7 recognized species in this genus:
 Brachysomophis atlanticus Blache & Saldanha, 1972
 Brachysomophis cirrocheilos (Bleeker, 1857) (Stargazer snake-eel)
 Brachysomophis crocodilinus (E. T. Bennett, 1833) (Crocodile snake-eel)
 Brachysomophis henshawi D. S. Jordan & Snyder, 1904 (Reptilian snake-eel)
 Brachysomophis longipinnis J. E. McCosker & J. E. Randall, 2001 (Sharp-fanged snake eel) 
 Brachysomophis porphyreus (Temminck & Schlegel, 1846)
 Brachysomophis umbonis J. E. McCosker & J. E. Randall, 2001

References

Ophichthidae
Taxa named by Johann Jakob Kaup